Thomas Vipont (died 1256) was a medieval Bishop of Carlisle.

Life

Vipont was a member of the family of the lords of Westmoreland but attained a magister degree from the schools. He was rector of Greystoke before he was elected bishop about September 1254, and consecrated on 7 February 1255. He was elected by the chapter of Carlisle Cathedral over the objections of King Henry III of England who had preferred that the chapter elect his chaplain John of Skipton. Henry did not push the issue, and Thomas was given the temporalities of the see on 24 December 1254. He died 14 October 1256.

Citations

References

 
 
 

Bishops of Carlisle
1256 deaths
13th-century English Roman Catholic bishops
Year of birth unknown